Dahir may refer to:
Dahir, Fujairah, a settlement in Fujairah, United Arab Emirates
Dahir Riyale Kahin (born 1952), the third president of the self-declared Republic of Somaliland
Raja Dahir (661-712), last Hindu ruler of Sindh and parts of Punjab in modern-day Pakistan
Berber Dahir, a decree created by the French protectorate in Morocco on May 16, 1930
Moroccan Dahir, a decree by the King of Morocco